Glan-alaw is a village in the community of Tref Alaw, Ynys Môn, Wales, which is 139.4 miles (224.3 km) from Cardiff and 222.1 miles (357.4 km) from London.

References

See also 
 List of localities in Wales by population

Villages in Anglesey